Fareed Ahmad Malik (born 10 August 1994) is an Afghan cricketer. He made his One Day International (ODI) debut for Afghanistan against the United Arab Emirates on 2 December 2014. He competed at the 2014 Asian Games. He made his Twenty20 International (T20I) debut for Afghanistan against the United Arab Emirates on 14 December 2016.

In September 2018, he was named in Kabul's squad in the first edition of the Afghanistan Premier League tournament. In September 2021, he was named as one of two travelling reserves in Afghanistan's squad for the 2021 ICC Men's T20 World Cup.

Controversies
During the 2022 Asia Cup match between Pakistan and Afghanistan, Asif Ali and Fareed were fined 25 per cent of their match fees for their on-field altercation after Fareed got Asif out. Both were punished for breaching Level 1 of the ICC Code of Conduct during the clash between Pakistan and Afghanistan. According to an ICC statement, Asif breached Article 2.6 of the ICC Code of Conduct for Players and Player Support Personnel, which relates to "using a gesture that is obscene, offensive or insulting during an International Match". Fareed was found to have breached Article 2.1.12, which relates to "inappropriate physical contact with a Player, Player Support Personnel, Umpire, Match Referee or any other person (including a spectator) during an International Match." Both players admitted their offence and accepted the sanctions proposed by match referee Andy Pycroft.

References

External links
 

1994 births
Living people
Afghan cricketers
Afghanistan One Day International cricketers
Afghanistan Twenty20 International cricketers
People from Nangarhar Province
Asian Games medalists in cricket
Cricketers at the 2014 Asian Games
Amo Sharks cricketers
Asian Games silver medalists for Afghanistan
Medalists at the 2014 Asian Games
Kabul Zwanan cricketers